This is a list of cricket grounds in the United Arab Emirates.  The grounds included in this list have held first-class, List-A and Twenty20 matches.  Additionally, some have hosted Test matches, One Day Internationals and Twenty20 Internationals.  The United Arab Emirates is the only nation that is not a full member of the International Cricket Council to have hosted Test matches.

List of grounds

External links
Cricket grounds in the United Arab Emirates - CricketArchive.

United Arab Emirates
Cricket grounds
Cricket grounds